Chantana Tharajan is a Thai voice actress and former actress. Chantana is best known for the roles of Doraemon in Doraemon 1979 and 2005 series. She has also voiced Naruto Uzumaki in Naruto, and Midori Yamabuki in Dr. Slump. She is currently working for Channel 9.

Voice roles 
 Doraemon as Doraemon
 Naruto as Uzumaki Naruto
 Pokémon as Satoshi
 Dragonball as Goku (Child)
 Parman as Suwa Mitsuo/Parman
 Dr. Slump as Midori Yamabuki

References 
 
 

Chantana Tharajan
Living people
1946 births
Chantana Tharajan